Holboca is a commune in Iași County, Western Moldavia, Romania, part of the Iași metropolitan area. It is composed of seven villages: Cristești, Dancu, Holboca, Orzeni, Rusenii Noi, Rusenii Vechi and Valea Lungă.

Natives
Ion Negrescu

References

Communes in Iași County
Localities in Western Moldavia